Skinhead Girl is a cover album by The Specials Released in 2000 (see 2000 in music).  After a project backing ska legend Desmond Dekker on his 1993 album King of Kings,  producer Roger Lomas brought the band back into the studio to record covers of popular Trojan Records songs.  Band member Lynval Golding left two weeks before the sessions, and was replaced by former Selecter guitarist Neol Davies on rhythm guitar.

Track listing
"I Can't Hide" (Ken Parker) - 3:32
"Blam Blam Fever" (Carl Grant, V. Grant) - 3:25
"Jezebel" (Wayne Shanklin) - 2:43
"El Pussycat Ska" (Roland Alphonso, Clement Dodd) - 3:40
"Soldering" (Ewart Beckford) - 4:06
"You Don't Know Like I Know" (Isaac Hayes, David Porter) - 2:36
"Memphis Underground" (Herbie Mann) - 3:56
"If I Didn't Love You" (Eric "Monty" Morris) - 3:42
"Them a Fe Get a Beatin'" (Peter Tosh) - 3:28
"Napoleon Solo" (Hopeton Lewis) - 3:09
"Skinhead Girl" (Monty Neysmith) - 3:31
"Fire Corner" (Clancy Eccles) - 3:47
"Bangerang Crash" (Eccles) - 3:04
"I Want to Go Home" (Derrick Morgan) - 2:39
"Old Man Say" (Eccles) - 2:46

Personnel
Neville Staple - vocals
Roddy Byers - vocals, guitar
Horace Panter - bass guitar
Neol Davies - rhythm guitar
Justin Dodsworth - keyboards
Steve Holdway - trombone
Paul Daleman - trumpet
Leigh Malin - tenor saxophone
Anthony Harty - percussion, drums
Roger Lomas - producer, mixing, engineer

References

2000 albums
The Specials albums
Covers albums